Nadata oregonensis is a species of moth in the family Notodontidae (the prominents). It was first described by Arthur Gardiner Butler in 1881 and it is found in North America.

The MONA or Hodges number for Nadata oregonensis is 7916.

References

Further reading

 
 
 

Notodontidae
Articles created by Qbugbot
Moths described in 1881